XENQ-AM/XHNQ-FM is a combo radio station in Tulancingo, Hidalgo. Broadcasting on 640 kHz and 90.1 MHz, XENQ/XHNQ is known as "NQ".

History
XENQ-AM came to air on December 12, 1955, owned by Narciso Solís Huerta and known as "La Voz de Hidalgo". In 1975, the station was acquired by Alejandro Wong.

XHNQ-FM came to air in 1994 as a combo frequency of the AM and increased its power in 2007.

Programming
NQ airs music throughout the day as well as news programming titled "Enlace Hidalgo".

References

Radio stations in Hidalgo (state)